In tropical geometry, a tropical projective space is the tropical analog of the classic projective space.

Definition 
Given a module  over the tropical semiring , its projectivization is the usual projective space of a module: the quotient space of the module (omitting the additive identity ) under scalar multiplication, omitting multiplication by the scalar additive identity 0:

In the tropical setting, tropical multiplication is classical addition, with unit real number 0 (not 1); tropical addition is minimum or maximum (depending on convention), with unit extended real number  (not 0), so it is clearer to write this using the extended real numbers, rather than the abstract algebraic units:

Just as in the classical case, the standard -dimensional tropical projective space is defined as the quotient of the standard -dimensional coordinate space by scalar multiplication, with all operations defined coordinate-wise:

Tropical multiplication corresponds to classical addition, so tropical scalar multiplication by  corresponds to adding  to all coordinates.

Notes

References 

 
 

Projective geometry
Tropical geometry